Macula  (pl. maculae ) is the Latin word for 'spot'. It is used in planetary nomenclature to refer to unusually dark areas on the surface of a planet or moon. They are seen on the icy surfaces of Pluto, Jupiter's moon Europa, Saturn's moon Titan, Neptune's moon Triton, and Pluto's moon Charon. The term was adopted for planetary nomenclature when high resolution pictures of Europa revealed unusual new surface features.

Notes

Links
 Lists of named maculae: on Europa, on Titan, on Triton

Planetary geology